Gardens & Villa is the debut studio album by American indie rock band Gardens & Villa. Released on 4 July 2011 by independent record label Secretly Canadian, the album was recorded in Oregon over two weeks in the summer of 2010 with the help of the band's labelmate Richard Swift. The album includes the singles "Black Hills" and "Orange Blossom."

Track listing

References 

2011 debut albums
Gardens & Villa albums
Secretly Canadian albums
Albums produced by Richard Swift (singer-songwriter)